This is a list of Bollywood films that were released in 2016. 

Dangal emerged as the highest grossing Hindi film ever.

Box office collection
The highest-grossing Bollywood films released in 2016, by worldwide box office gross revenue, are as follows:

Dangal grossed over  worldwide, and is currently the highest-grossing Indian film of all time. Sultan has grossed over  worldwide, and is the 7th highest-grossing Indian film of all time.

January–March 

Worked By Harsh Kumar

April–June

July–September

October–December

See also

 List of Bollywood films of 2017
 List of Bollywood films of 2015

Notes

References 

2016
Bollywood
Bollywood